Freylinia tropica is a Southern African shrub with lax, spreading branches and found in the South African province of Limpopo and in Zimbabwe.

Named after the botanist, Pietro Lorenzo, the last Count of Freylino, owner of a famous garden at Buttigliera d'Asti near Torino in Italy in the early 19th century.

External links
Freylino
Freylinia tropica PlantZAfrica.com

tropica